Las Acevedo was a folk band produced and designed by Dominican artist and journalist Ismael Ogando, as part of a movement demanding fair access to quality education in the Dominican Republic, performing for the first time at the concert "VOCES AMARILLAS" at the Plaza España in Santo Domingo for this cause. The duo was composed of Anabel and Cristabel Acevedo, twin sisters born in Santiago de los Caballeros, Dominican Republic.

The project reached international popularity with their single "Chaka Chaka" in 2010 after releasing the EP The Weather Smells Like Oranges, a naive pop five-track demo composed in Spanglish, which was featured as the Caribbean reference for the so-called New Weird America music wave.

Labeled as "picnic pop", the band was featured by Club Fonograma and toured Europe, South and North America, after reaching a momentum with the festival VIVA LA CANCION in Madrid 2011.

References

Dominican Republic musical groups
Feminist musicians
DIY culture
New Weird America
Indie music groups